This is a partial list of notable people affiliated with Episcopal Divinity School, located in Cambridge, Massachusetts, United States, and with its predecessors, the Episcopal Theological School and the Philadelphia Divinity School.

Faculty
 Alexander Viets Griswold Allen (1841–1908), church historian
 Nathan D. Baxter (born 1948), bishop of Central Pennsylvania
 Robert Avon Bennett (born 1933), Old Testament scholar, first African-American faculty member
 Charles Bennison (born 1943), bishop of Pennsylvania
 John Everitt Booty (1925-2013), dean of the School of Theology, University of the South
 Katie Geneva Cannon (born 1949), feminist theologian
 Otis Charles (1926-2013), dean, bishop of Utah
 Steven Charleston (born 1949), dean, bishop of Alaska
 John B. Coburn (1925–2006), dean, bishop of Massachusetts
 Frederick William Dillistone (1903–1993), theologian, dean of Liverpool
 Angus Dun (1892–1971), dean, bishop of Washington
 Elisabeth Schüssler Fiorenza (born 1938), feminist biblical scholar
 Joseph Fletcher (1905–1991), founder of situational ethics
John Fulton (priest), professor of canon law
 Ezra Palmer Gould (1841–1900), New Testament scholar (Philadelphia Divinity School)
 George Zabriskie Gray (1837–1889), dean
 Henry R. Gummey, liturgist
 Harvey H. Guthrie, Jr. (1924-2017), dean, Old Testament scholar
 Carter Heyward (born 1945), feminist theologian and one of the Philadelphia Eleven
 Suzanne R. Hiatt (1936–2002), professor of homiletics, pastoral theologian, and one of the Philadelphia Eleven
 Lloyd G. Patterson (1924–1999), patristics scholar
 John Punnett Peters (1852–1921), Hebrew scholar (Philadelphia Divinity School)
 James Thayer Addison (1887-1953) Class of 1913, Vice President of National Council of the Episcopal Church
 Kwok Pui Lon, professor of constructive, postmodern, & feminist theologies
 Joan M. Martin, professor womanist & Christian social Ethics
 Angela Bauer-Levesque, Vice President for Academic Affairs/Academic Dean, feminist professor Hebrew Bible 
 Lawrence Wills, professor of Hebrew Bible & New Testament
 Gale Yee, professor of Hebrew Bible
 William Kondrath, professor of Pastoral Theology
 Suzanne Ehly, faculty in voice, body, culture & leadership
 Susie Snyder, professor of Contemporary Theology, Sociology & Religion
 Patrick Cheng, professor of queer theology
 Katherine Hancock Ragsdale (born 1959), dean and president
 Edward Rodman, professor of Pastoral Theology
 Charles W. F. Smith (1905–1993), New Testament scholar
 Owen C. Thomas (1922-2015), professor of philosophy of religion, and systematic theology.
 Fredrica Harris Thompsett, Academic Dean, professor of History
 Sheryl Kujawa-Holbrook, Academic Dean, professor of Pastoral Theology

Alumni
George Councell (born 1949), bishop of New Jersey
Peter Elliott (born 1954), dean, Christ Church Cathedral, Vancouver
Philip Gambone (born 1948), author
Mary Douglas Glasspool (born 1954), suffragan bishop in the Episcopal Diocese of Los Angeles
John Guernsey (born 1953), bishop of the Anglican Diocese of the Mid-Atlantic
James A. Kowalski (born 1951), dean of the Cathedral of Saint John the Divine, New York
Bruce Lawrence (born 1941), scholar of religions
Jeffrey Mello, bishop of (Connecticut)
Robert Williams (1955–1992), gay priest

Episcopal Theological School
Daniel Dulany Addison (1863–1936), priest, author
John Melville Burgess (1909–2003), bishop of Massachusetts and the first African American to head an Episcopal diocese.
William Wilfred Campbell (1860–1918), Canadian poet
Jonathan Daniels (1939–1965), civil rights martyr (died before graduation)
Bob Franke (born 1947), singer-songwriter (left to pursue a musical career)
Percy Stickney Grant (1860–1927), Christian socialist
Alden Moinet Hathaway (born 1933), bishop of Pittsburgh
Henry Hobson (1891–1983), bishop of Southern Ohio
Arthur Lichtenberger (1900–1968), twenty-first presiding bishop of the Episcopal Church
Arthur Moulton (1873–1962), bishop of Utah
Endicott Peabody (1857–1944), priest, founder of Groton School
William D. Persell (born 1943), bishop of Chicago, assisting bishop of Ohio
James De Wolf Perry (1871–1947), eighteenth presiding bishop of the Episcopal Church
George F. Regas (born 1930), priest, activist
Ruby Sales (born 1948), social activist
Peter Selby (born 1941), bishop of Worcester
Henry Knox Sherrill (1890–1980), twentieth presiding bishop of the Episcopal Church
Anson Phelps Stokes (1905–1986), bishop of Massachusetts
William B. Spofford (1921-2013), bishop of Eastern Oregon, assistant bishop of Washington
Logan Herbert Roots (1870–1945), bishop of Hankow
William Greenough Thayer (1863–1934), priest, educator, headmaster of St. Mark's School
Paul Van Buren (1924–1998), "Death of God" theologian
Geralyn Wolf (born 1947), bishop of Rhode Island
 Mikael Mogren (born 1969), bishop of Västerås

Philadelphia Divinity School
Allen W. Brown (1909–1990), bishop of Albany
Wallace E. Conkling (1896–1979), bishop of Chicago
William Chauncey Emhardt (1874–1950), priest and ecumenist
Reginald H. Fuller (1915–2007), priest, biblical scholar
Alfred A. Gilman (1878–1966), missionary bishop of Hankow
Elwood Haines (1893–1949), bishop of Iowa
Wilbur Hogg (1916–1986), bishop of Albany
Francis W. Lickfield, fifth bishop of Quincy
Lyman Pierson Powell (1866–1946), president of Hobart and William Smith Colleges
Jules Louis Prevost (1863–1937), missionary to Alaska
Theophilus Gould Steward (1843–1924), A.M.E. missionary, professor at Wilberforce University
Paul Washington (1921–2002), priest and activist

References

External links
 Official website

Episcopal Church (United States)
Anglican seminaries and theological colleges
Seminaries and theological colleges in Massachusetts
Educational institutions established in 1974
Universities and colleges in Cambridge, Massachusetts

Harvard Square